Transcription factor E2F7 is a protein that in humans is encoded by the E2F7 gene.

References

Further reading